English Clause may refer to:

Law 

 A vertical restraint under competition law

Linguistics 

 English clause syntax